Tebikerai is a settlement in Kiribati.  It is located on the atoll of Maiana, while the nearest settlement, about six nautical miles south, is Tebiauea.

References

	

Populated places in Kiribati